Namibia competed in the 2014 Commonwealth Games in Glasgow, Scotland from July 23 to August 3, 2014.

Athletics

Men

Women

Cycling

Mountain biking

Road
Men

Women

Shooting

Women
Shotgun

Triathlon

Weightlifting

 Powerlifting

Wrestling

Men's freestyle

References

Nations at the 2014 Commonwealth Games
Namibia at the Commonwealth Games
Commonwealth